Luperina testacea, the flounced rustic, is a moth of the family Noctuidae. It is found in Europe, Asia Minor and Armenia.

Technical description and variation

The wingspan is 30–35 mm. The length of the forewings is 14–18 mm."Forewing light to dark fuscous, often with a faint ochreous or brownish tinge; the veins darker; inner and outer lines double, filled in with pale, but varying in intensity; claviform stigma of the ground colour with black line; orbicular and reniform paler with darker centres; submarginal line pale, obscure, often shown only by the dark terminal areabeyond it: hindwing whitish with dark veins and black marginal line; of the forms without any ochreous or rufous tinge, ab. obsoleta Tutt is pale grey without definite dark markings; — ab. cinerea Tutt has the grey darker, more fuscous; — ab. nigrescens Tutt has the ground colour blackish of varying degrees of intensity; the inner and outer lines are sometimes connected by a black streak: — in ab. unca Haw., the streak is thin and the two lines well separated; — ab. x-notata Haw. has the streak thick and the lines closely approximated".

Biology
The moth flies in one generation from mid-July to early October .

Larva dirty whiteish, without lines; head and plates brown. The larvae feed on various grasses and grains.

Notes
The flight season refers to Belgium and the Netherlands. This may vary in other parts of the range.

References

External links

Flounced rustic at UKmoths
Funet Taxonomy
Lepiforum.de
Vlindernet.nl 

Luperina
Moths described in 1775
Moths of Asia
Moths of Europe
Taxa named by Michael Denis
Taxa named by Ignaz Schiffermüller